The 1950 College Football All-America team is composed of college football players who were selected as All-Americans by various organizations and writers that chose College Football All-America Teams in 1950. The eight selectors recognized by the NCAA as "official" for the 1950 season are (1) the All-America Board (AAB), (2) the American Football Coaches Association (AFCA), (3) the Associated Press (AP), (4) the Football Writers Association of America (FW), (5) the International News Service (INS), (6) the Newspaper Enterprise Association (NEA), (7) the Sporting News (SN), and (8) the United Press (UP).

Ohio State halfback Vic Janowicz, Army end Dan Foldberg, and Texas guard Bud McFadin were the only three players to be unanimously named first-team All-Americans by all eight official selectors. Janowicz was awarded the 1950 Heisman Trophy.

Consensus All-Americans
For the year 1950, the NCAA recognizes eight published All-American teams as "official" designations for purposes of its consensus determinations. The following chart identifies the NCAA-recognized consensus All-Americans and displays which first-team designations they received.

All-American selections for 1950

Ends
 Dan Foldberg, Army 
 Bill McColl, Stanford (College Football Hall of Fame) 
 Bucky Curtis, Vanderbilt 
 Don Stonesifer, Northwestern 
 Jim Doran, Iowa State 
 Don Menasco, Texas 
 Blaine Earon, Duke 
 Frank Anderson, Oklahoma 
 Dorne Dibble, Michigan State 
 Bob Carey, Michigan State 
 Herb Agocs, Penn 
 Tony Klimek, Illinois

Tackles
 Bob Gain, Kentucky (College Football Hall of Fame) 
 Jim Weatherall, Oklahoma (College Football Hall of Fame) 
 Allen Wahl, Michigan 
 Hollie Donan, Princeton (College Football Hall of Fame) 
 Charles Shira, Army 
 Al Carapella, Miami 
 Albert Tate, Illinois 
 Bill Trautwein, Ohio State 
 Jim Staton, Wake Forest 
 C.T. Hewgley, Wyoming 
 Paul Lea, Tulane 
 Elmer Costa, North Carolina State 
 Paul Giroski, Rice

Guards
 Bud McFadin, Texas (College Football Hall of Fame) 
 Les Richter, California (College Football Hall of Fame) 
 Bob Ward, Maryland (College Football Hall of Fame) 
 Ted Daffer, Tennessee 
 Elmer Stout, Army 
 Donn Moomaw, UCLA (College Football Hall of Fame) 
 Bob Momsen, Ohio State 
 Bill Ciaravino, Lehigh 
 Bernie Lemonick, Penn 
 Mike Mizerany, Alabama 
 Pat Cannamella, USC 
 John Biltz, Ohio State 
 Jerry Audette, Columbia 
 Brad Glass, Princeton 
 Leo Cahill, Illinois

Centers
 Jerry Groom, Notre Dame (College Football Hall of Fame) 
 Irv Holdash, North Carolina 
 Redmond Finney, Princeton 
 Bill Vohaska, Illinois 
 Bob McCullough, Ohio State 
 John Pierik, Cornell

Quarterbacks
 Babe Parilli, Kentucky 
 Bob Williams, Notre Dame (College Football Hall of Fame) 
 Don Heinrich, Washington (College Football Hall of Fame)

Halfbacks
 Vic Janowicz, Ohio State (College Football Hall of Fame) (1950 Heisman Trophy winner) 
 Kyle Rote, SMU (College Football Hall of Fame) 
 Bobby Reynolds, Nebraska (College Football Hall of Fame) 
 Eddie Talboom, Wyoming (College Football Hall of Fame) 
 Dick Kazmaier, Princeton (College Football Hall of Fame) (1951 Heisman Trophy winner) 
 Johnny Bright, Drake (College and Canadian Football Hall of Fame) 
 Reds Bagnell, Penn (College Football Hall of Fame) 
 Chuck Ortmann, Michigan 
 Bill Cox, Duke

Fullbacks
 Leon Heath, Oklahoma 
 Sonny Grandelius, Michigan State 
 John Dottley, Ole Miss

Defensive backs
 Ed Salem, Alabama 
 Dick Sprague, Washington 
 Ed Withers, Wisconsin 
 Buddy Jones, Oklahoma 
 Wilford White, Arizona State

Key
 Bold – Consensus All-American
 -1 – First-team selection
 -2 – Second-team selection
 -3 – Third-team selection

Official selectors
 AAB = All-America Board
 AFCA = American Football Coaches Association
 APO/APD = Associated Press: "For the first time in history, the Associated Press All-American football team was divided into two platoons, offensive and defensive." The "APO" designation refers to players selected for the offensive squad, and "APD" refers to selections for the defensive squad.
 FWO/FWD = Football Writers Association of America. The "FWO" designation refers to players selected for the offensive squad, and "FWD" refers to selections for the defensive squad
 INSO/INSD = International News Service: "The 22-man All-America, divided for the third straight year into offensive and defensive platoons of equal merit, was pioneered by INS in 1948 in keeping with the new age of football specialization, and since has come into national favor. As usual, all eight backs on the INS team are offensive standouts. The only distinction drawn is that the four backs on the offensive side of the team saw no work on defense." The "INSO" designation refers to players selected for the offensive squad, and "INSD" refers to selections for the defensive squad.
 NEA = Newspaper Enterprise Association
 SN = Sporting News
 UP = United Press

Other selectors
 CP = Central Press Association
 WC = Walter Camp Football Foundation

See also
 1950 All-Big Seven Conference football team
 1950 All-Big Ten Conference football team
 1950 All-Pacific Coast Conference football team
 1950 All-SEC football team
 1950 All-Southwest Conference football team

References

All-America Team
College Football All-America Teams